Poulton Hall is a country house in Poulton Road, Poulton, an area to the south of Bebington, Wirral, Merseyside, England.  The present hall was built in 1653 and was extended in the following centuries.  It is built in pebbledashed brick with stone dressings and slate roof.  Its contents include a three-manual pipe organ.  In the grounds is a 17th-century former brewhouse that has a clock tower with a 32-bell carillon.  The house and the brewhouse are both recorded in the National Heritage List for England as designated Grade II listed buildings.  Musical concerts are held in the house, and the gardens, which contain 20th-century sculptures, are open to the public twice a year.

History

Poulton Hall has been the home of the Poulton Lancelyn family since the 12th century.  In the 16th century their surname became Lancelyn Green (or Greene) when Elizabeth Lancelyn married Randle Greene of Congleton.  It has been alleged that a castle existed on the site, but there is now no reliable evidence of earthworks or a castle.  The present hall dates from 1653, and it was extended to the rear in 1720 when Revd Robert Green added a library.  In 1840 a larger addition was made, consisting of a dining room and service wing, and a billiard room containing a pipe organ was built to the left of this in the 1880s.

Architecture

Exterior
The house is constructed in pebbledashed brick with stone dressings and slate roofs.  The original block has two storeys and a front of three bays, with a single storey wing to the left.  There is a central Tuscan porch and glazed doors.  The windows have architraves; in the ground floor the windows, which include French windows, have friezes and cornices, and in  the upper floor they are sash windows with glazing bars.  The wing has a hipped roof and a clerestory.  On the right side of the house, the first two bays are bowed.  The rear parts of the house are similar to the main block, but simpler.

Interior
Inside the house is a 17th-century staircase with twisted balusters, flat-topped newels, and added Gothic features.  The library has three recesses on each side that are lined with books.  The dining room contains a screen of Ionic columns.  The present organ has two manuals,  It was built in about 1902 by J. J. Binns and rebuilt in Clay Cross Methodist Church in 1922 by Blackett and Howden.  In 1940 a new stop was added by Willis, and in 1971 the organ was moved to Newbold Church, Chesterfield.  In about 1983 further additions were made, again by Willis.  The organ was moved into Poulton Hall in 1993 by S .R. L. Green when further additions were made.

Outbuildings

The most notable structure in the grounds is a former brewhouse that stands to the northeast of the hall,  This dates from the 17th century and is constructed in brick on a stone base, with stone dressings and a slate roof.  The building has two storeys and three bays, and the windows and entrances have flat arches with stone keystones.  There are entrances in the first and second bays, and in the upper storey there are louvred windows in the first and third bays.  On the left side of the building is an external staircase leading to a first floor entrance.  On the roof is a square clock turret with louvred sides.  The turret contains a carillon of 32 bells that are computer controlled.  Of these, 23 were cast by the Royal Dutch Bellfoundry in 2007–09, and the other are second-hand, and were tuned by John Taylor of Loughborough.  Behind the brewhouse is a four-bay shippon.  This has two turrets, one of which contains a clock, and the other a bell.  The bell was formerly in Lindisfarne College.

Gardens

At the entrance to the gardens is a monument erected by Scirard de Lancelyn in the 11th century.  The path then leads across a ha-ha to lawns and the Walled Garden.  The Walled Garden was laid out in the 1980s by June Lancelyn Green and contains contemporary sculptures.  Some of these reflect the literary interests of her late husband, Roger Lancelyn Green;  these include Lewis Carroll, C. S. Lewis, Peter Pan, and Sherlock Holmes.  Included in the garden are sculptures by Jim Heath, Sue Sharples, Judith Railton, John and Carol White, Cilla West (daughter of Roger Lancelyn Green), and Sean Rice.

Appraisal

The hall and the brewhouse were both designated as Grade II listed buildings on 27 December 1962.  Grade II is the lowest of the three grades of listing and is applied to buildings that are "nationally important and of special interest".  Hartwell et al in the Buildings of England series describe the house as being "deeply historical but not at all grand".

Present day

Tours of the house and outbuildings are arranged, as well as musical recitals and concerts, and the gardens are open to the public twice a year under the National Gardens Scheme.  The barn can be hired for private functions, and the hall and its grounds are available for filming.  They have been used as locations in the film Longford, and in the television series The Owl Service.

See also

Listed buildings in Poulton, Bebington

Notes

References

Country houses in Merseyside
Grade II listed buildings in Merseyside
Grade II listed houses